The Nynorsk Literature Prize is awarded annually by Noregs Mållag, Det Norske Teatret and Det Norske Samlaget for the best book in either Nynorsk or dialect. The award is presented for the best novel, poetry, novellas, or drama in the past year.

Winners 
List of winners.

1982 – Eldrid Lunden,  Gjenkjennelsen
1983 – Kjartan Fløgstad, U3
1984 – Alfred Hauge,  Serafen
1985 – Paal-Helge Haugen, Det overvintra lyset
1986 – Kjartan Fløgstad,  Det 7. klima
1987 – Edvard Hoem, Ave Eva
1988 – Johannes Heggland,  Meisterens søner
1989 – Helge Torvund, Den monotone triumf
1990 – Liv Nysted, Som om noe noengang tar slutt
1991 – Marit Tusvik, Ishuset
1992 – Jon Fosse, Bly og vatn
1993 – Einar Økland, Istaden for roman og humor
1994 – Solfrid Sivertsen, Grøn koffert
1995 – Lars Amund Vaage, Rubato 
1996 – Oddmund Hagen, Utmark
1997 – Marie Takvam, Dikt i samling
1998 – Brit Bildøen,  Tvillingfeber
1999 – Åse Marie Nesse, Dikt i samling (1999), Faust (1993, 1999) and Mitt hjarte slo (1999)
2000 – Rune Belsvik,  Ein naken gut
2001 – Ragnar Hovland, Ei vinterreise
2002 – Inger Bråtveit, Munn mot ein frosen fjord
2003 – Jon Fosse, Auge i vind
2004 – not awarded
2005 – Øyvind Vågnes, Ekko
2006 – Eilev Groven Myhren for Ringdrotten, a translation of The Lord of the Rings
2007 – Frode Grytten for Rom ved havet, rom i byen, novella
2008 – Gunnhild Øyehaug for Vente, blinke, novel
2009 – Kjartan Fløgstad for Grense Jakobselv, novel
2010 – Jan Roar Leikvoll for Fiolinane, novel
2011 – Marit Eikemo for Samtale ventar, novel
2012 – Lars Amund Vaage for Syngja, novel
2013 – Sigrun Slapgard for Englestien, novel
2014 – Lars Petter Sveen for Guds barn, novel
2015 – Eirik Ingebrigtsen for Spikrar frå fallande plankar, novel
2016 – Ruth Lillegraven for Sigd, poems
2017 – Olaug Nilssen for Tung tids tale, novel
2018 – Brit Bildøen for Tre vegar til havet, novel

References

Norwegian literary awards
Nynorsk
Awards established in 1982
1982 establishments in Norway